is a passenger railway station located in the city of Asago, Hyōgo Prefecture, Japan, operated by West Japan Railway Company (JR West).

Lines

Station layout
The station consists of two ground-level island platforms connected by an elevated station building. The station is staffed.

Platforms

Adjacent stations

History
Wadayama Station opened on April 1, 1906. With the privatization of the Japan National Railways (JNR) on April 1, 1987, the station came under the aegis of the West Japan Railway Company.

Passenger statistics
In fiscal 2016, the station was used by an average of 693 passengers daily

Surrounding area
 Asago City Hall
 Wadayama Health Center

See also
List of railway stations in Japan

References

External links

 Station Official Site

Railway stations in Japan opened in 1906
Railway stations in Hyōgo Prefecture
Sanin Main Line
Asago, Hyōgo